Beyoğlan is a village in the İskilip District of Çorum Province in Turkey. Its population is 361 (2022).

References

Villages in İskilip District